Tarhunah Municipality is one of the former municipality (baladiyat) of Libya from 1983 to 1995.  It is in the north of the country, in the position later (2001-2007) occupied by Tarhuna Wa Msalata District.

Tarhunah was brought to international attention in the 1990s, when it was believed that an underground chemical weapons facility was being built there, following the discovery of a previous smaller above-ground facility at Rabta (Algeria?).

See also
 Tarhuna Wa Msalata District

External links
Reassessing Libya: an analysis from Jane's Nuclear, Biological and Chemical Defence
U.S. Department of Defense news photo - artist's concept of the construction of the chemical weapons facility

Municipalities of Libya (1983–1995)